Gspon is a village in the Swiss Alps, located in the canton of Valais. It belongs to the latter municipality.

Accessible by cable car from Stalden via Staldenried, Gspon is a car-free village and a year-round tourist destination. In winter Gspon's small ski area is open.

Attractions
The village, characterised by its large green valleys and hills, is located in the Alps and is popular with hikers. Hiking is considered one of the village's main attractions along with other mountain-related activities. Gspon, which has a population of 585, also has a hotel, restaurant and bar. Cable cars link to other locations above and under Gspon from the village itself. 

Highlights and facts

Highest still operating irrigation channels in Switzerland.
Highest football stadium in Europe, the Ottmar Hitzfeld Stadium.
Hiking and climbing routes for all ability levels.
Snowshoe trekking in winter.
St. Anna Chapel, built in 1691.

General information

At an altitude of  the traffic-free village of Gspon is a starting point for both leisurely and challenging hikes. With no road into the village, access is only by cableway from Stalden via Staldenried. The village is the location of the St. Anna Chapel, built in 1691. The highest irrigation channels that are still in operation are located here, while two ski lifts are open during the winter for downhill skiers. The landscape can also be explored on snowshoes during winter.

The Bischofwäg, leading from Staldenried through pine forest and the Breiterbach Gorge to Visperterminen, was the path along which the bishop of Sion travelled. A green sign-posted viniculture theme path starts at Visp railway station. The Suonen hiking trail circuit to Finileri runs through forests and alpine pastures and alongside the historic irrigation channels. A more challenging trail leads from Gspon via the Gebidum and Bistinen Passes to the Simplon Pass.

References
Swisstopo topographic maps
mySwitzerland.com[1]

External links

Gspon on Wanderland.ch

Villages in Valais
Ski areas and resorts in Switzerland
Car-free villages in Switzerland